General elections were held in Liechtenstein on 1 February 1970. The Patriotic Union won 8 of the 15 seats in the Landtag, the first time it had held a majority since its formation in 1936. However, it continued the coalition government with the Progressive Citizens' Party, which had been in power since 1938. Voter turnout was 94.8%, although only male citizens were allowed to vote.

Results

By electoral district

References

Liechtenstein
General election
Elections in Liechtenstein
Liechtenstein general election